Shtit is a village in the municipality of Svilengrad, in Haskovo Province, in southern Bulgaria. Its current name dates to 1934; prior to that, it was known as Skutari.

References

Villages in Haskovo Province